Oliver Alfonsi (born 3 June 2003) is a Swedish football midfielder who plays for Varbergs BoIS.

He is a son of footballer and manager Joakim Persson.

References

2003 births
Living people
Swedish footballers
Association football midfielders
Allsvenskan players
Varbergs BoIS players
Sweden youth international footballers